Elehuris Montero (born August 17, 1998) is a Dominican professional baseball third baseman for the Colorado Rockies of Major League Baseball (MLB). He made his MLB debut in 2022.

Career

St. Louis Cardinals organization
Montero signed with the St. Louis Cardinals as an international free agent in August 2014. He made his professional debut in 2015 with the Dominican Summer League Cardinals where he hit .252 with three home runs and 30 RBIs in 57 games. He played 2016 with the Dominican Summer League Cardinals, batting .260 with one home run and 26 RBIs in 61 games, and 2017 with the Gulf Coast Cardinals where he compiled a .277 batting average with five home runs and 36 RBIs in 52 games.

Montero started 2018 with the Peoria Chiefs where he was named a Midwest League All-Star. After slashing .321/.381/.529 with 15 home runs, 69 RBIs, and 28 doubles in 102 games, he was promoted to the Palm Beach Cardinals in August. In 24 games for Palm Beach, he hit .286 with one home run and 13 RBIs. Following the season, Montero was named the Midwest League Most Valuable Player.

Montero began 2019 with the Springfield Cardinals, and was placed on the injured list in April. He returned to play in May, but was once again placed on the IL at the end of the month. He was activated once again in July. Over 59 games with Springfield, Montero hit .188 with seven home runs and 18 RBIs. He was selected to play in the Arizona Fall League for the Glendale Desert Dogs following the season. Montero was added to St. Louis' 40–man roster following the 2019 season. Montero did not play a minor league game in 2020 since the season was cancelled due to the COVID-19 pandemic.

Colorado Rockies
On February 1, 2021, Montero was traded to the Colorado Rockies along with Austin Gomber, Mateo Gil, Tony Locey, and Jake Sommers in exchange for Nolan Arenado. To begin the 2021 season, he was assigned to the Hartford Yard Goats. He was promoted to the Albuquerque Isotopes during the season. Over 120 games for the 2021 season, he slashed .278/.360/.529 with 28 home runs and 86 RBIs. 

He returned to the Isotopes to begin the 2022 season. On April 29, 2022, Montero was recalled and promoted to the major leagues for the first time after Kris Bryant was placed on the injured list.

See also
 List of Major League Baseball players from the Dominican Republic

References

External links

1998 births
Living people
Sportspeople from Santo Domingo
Dominican Republic expatriate baseball players in the United States
Major League Baseball players from the Dominican Republic
Major League Baseball third basemen
Colorado Rockies players
Dominican Summer League Cardinals players
Gulf Coast Cardinals players
Peoria Chiefs players
Palm Beach Cardinals players
Springfield Cardinals players
Hartford Yard Goats players
Albuquerque Isotopes players
Glendale Desert Dogs players
Estrellas Orientales players